Edward Norvack (born c. 1924) was a Canadian football player who played for the Winnipeg Blue Bombers. From Glace Bay, Nova Scotia, Norvack served in the Canadian Air Force during World War II and played soccer for the Cape Breton Highlanders. Norvack was dropped by the team in September 1954.

References

1920s births
Possibly living people
Winnipeg Blue Bombers players